Shenzhen Institute of Information Technology (SZIIT) is a public college in Shenzhen, Guangdong, China. The institution is sponsored by the Shenzhen People's Government.

Overview
SZIIT is the National Demonstration (core) Higher Vocational Institution, National Demonstration Software Vocational Institution and Pilot School of the ‘Sino-German Automotive Vocational Education Project’ launched by the Ministry of Education.

The institution offers three-year junior college programs, four-year undergraduate programs and postgraduate programs,and has been rated among the TOP 50 Chinese higher vocational schools in terms of teaching management, internship management and teaching resources and TOP 50 service providers.

History
Three schools established back in 1982, namely Shenzhen Institute of Education, Shenzhen Industrial School and Shenzhen School of Finance and Economics.

The merge of three schools in April 2002, Institute of Information Technology (SZIIT) is a public full-time institution providing higher education in Shenzhen. 

In 2019, as one of the first batch of schools involved in High Level Higher Vocational School and Disciplinary Development Plan with Chinese Characteristics (‘Double High Plan’).

Faculty departmental structure

The College has 11 schools, which are:
School of Computer Science
School of Software Engineering
School of Foreign Languages
School of Information and Telecommunication
School of Microelectronics
School of Digital Media
School of Intelligent Manufacturing and Equipment
School of Traffic and Environment
School of Management
School of Finance and Economics
School of Sino-German Robotics Academy

Staff
There are 1577 faculty members, including 944 full-time teachers, 430 of whom are doctors, accounting for 50% of the faculty team; 89% of teachers are qualified both as academic lecturer and career mentor.

Campus
 Headquarters: No. 2188, Longxiang Blvd., Longgang District, Shenzhen,Guangdong,China
 The campus covers an area of 925,000 square meters (1,389 mu), with a construction area of 584,800 square meters.

References

Universities and colleges in Shenzhen